WVPV-LP was a Variety formatted broadcast radio station licensed to Cairo, West Virginia, serving Northwestern Ritchie County, West Virginia.  WVPV-LP was owned and operated by Town of Cairo. Its license was cancelled October 2, 2019.

References

2014 establishments in West Virginia
Defunct radio stations in the United States
Radio stations established in 2014
VPV-LP
Radio stations disestablished in 2019
2019 disestablishments in West Virginia
VPV-LP